Leonard Alonzo Younce (January 8, 1917 – March 26, 2000) was an American football player and coach.

Playing career
Born in Dayton, Oregon, Younce attended Roosevelt High School in Portland and then played college football at Oregon State University.  He was selected in the eighth round (67th overall) by the New York Giants in the 1941 NFL Draft, and played a variety of positions, including linebacker, offensive lineman, placekicker, and punter.

Coaching career
After retiring from playing, Younce was an assistant coach at Oregon State University from 1949 to 1954, and with the Saskatchewan Roughriders and Edmonton Eskimos.

Later years
Younce was coaxed out of retirement to coach high school football for one year at Joseph High School in Joseph, Wallowa County, Oregon, in 1992.  He intended to continue, but health problems prevented his return.

Younce was an inaugural inductee of the Oregon Sports Hall of Fame in 1980, and was inducted into the OSU Athletic Hall of Fame in 1988.  He died in Portland, Oregon on March 26, 2000.

References

External links

1917 births
2000 deaths
American football linebackers
American football offensive guards
American football punters
Edmonton Elks coaches
New York Giants players
Oregon State Beavers football coaches
Oregon State Beavers football players
People from Dayton, Oregon
Players of American football from Portland, Oregon
Sportspeople from Portland, Oregon
Roosevelt High School (Oregon) alumni